Cryptodifflugia is a genus of arcellinid testate amoebae. It contains all the species previously grouped as the genus Difflugiella, which is now a synonym of Cryptodifflugia.

Description
Cryptodifflugia species are characterized by a shell with an oval egg-like shape with a short neck. Their surface is either smooth or adhering foreign particles. The shell can be colorless, yellow or brown, composed of an outer proteinaceous material that is usually lined. The shell's aperture is terminal, and has either a circular or an oval shape. They present pseudopods in the form of ectoplasmic anastomosing reticulopods, i.e. like fine threads that can branch or anastomose (meaning they can form links with each other) to create a dense network.

Classification
The classification of the genus, as revised in 2017, identifies 23 species along with some subspecies:
Cryptodifflugia angulata Playfair, 1917 – Australia
Cryptodifflugia angusta (Schönborn, 1965) Page, 1966 – Bulgaria, Poland, Germany
Cryptodifflugia angustastoma Beyens et Chardez, 1982 – Belgium
Cryptodifflugia apiculata (Cash, 1904) Page, 1966 – England, Russia, Germany, Romania
Cryptodifflugia bassini Bobrov, 2001 – Russia, Japan
Cryptodifflugia brevicolla Golemansky, 1979 – Vietnam
Cryptodifflugia collum (Chardez, 1971) Bobrov & Mazei, 2017 – Belgium, France
Cryptodifflugia compressa Penard, 1902 – cosmopolitan
Cryptodifflugia compressa angustioris Tarnogradsky, 1959 – Caucasus, Belgium, Germany, Spitsbergen
Cryptodifflugia compressa australis Playfair, 1917 – Australia
Cryptodifflugia compressa ovata Playfair, 1917 – Australia
Cryptodifflugia crenulata Playfair, 1917 – cosmopolitan
Cryptodifflugia crenulata glabra (Schönborn, 1965) Bobrov & Mazei, 2017 – Germany, Poland
Cryptodifflugia crenulata globosa Playfair, 1917 – Australia, Poland, Germany, Greenland, Romania, Vietnam, South Georgia, Île de la Possession, Îles Crozet
Cryptodifflugia horrida Page, 1966 – Bulgaria, Germany, Poland, Czech Republic, Spitsbergen, Vietnam
Cryptodifflugia lanceolata Golemansky, 1970 – cosmopolitan
Cryptodifflugia leachi Nicholls, 2006 – Canada
Cryptodifflugia minuta (Playfair, 1917) Bobrov & Mazei, 2017 – Australia, Russia, Greenland, United States of America, Île de la Possession, Îles Crozet
Cryptodifflugia oviformis Penard, 1890 – cosmopolitan
Cryptodifflugia oviformis fusca (Penard, 1890) Bonnet et Thomas, 1956 – cosmopolitan
Cryptodifflugia paludosa Golemansky, 1981 – Black Sea
Cryptodifflugia patinata (Schönborn, 1964) Bobrov & Mazei, 2017 – Germany, Poland
Cryptodifflugia psammophila (Golemansky, 1970) Bobrov & Mazei, 2017 – Baltic Sea, Black Sea, Mediterranean Sea, Caribbean Sea, Atlantic Ocean, Pacific Ocean
Cryptodifflugia pusilla Playfair, 1917 – cosmopolitan
Cryptodifflugia pusilla conica Playfair, 1917 – Australia
Cryptodifflugia sacculus (Penard, 1902) Deflandre, 1953 – cosmopolitan
Cryptodifflugia sacculus sakotschawi Tarnogradsky, 1959 – Caucasus
Cryptodifflugia splendida (Schönborn, 1965) Page, 1966 – Poland, Germany
Cryptodifflugia valida Playfair, 1917 – Australia, Chile
Cryptodifflugia voigti Schmidt, 1926 – Germany, Russia, Belgium, Romania
Cryptodifflugia vulgaris (Francé, 1913) Volz, 1928 – Germany, Bulgaria, Russia

Excluded taxa
Several taxa previously accredited to Cryptodifflugia or Difflugiella have been excluded from the 2017 revision:
 Difflugiella heynigi Schönborn, 1965 and Cryptodifflugia lamingerae Chardez, 1977 do not match the description of the genus because they are larger and characterized by an apical aboral end of the shell and a prominent long neck with collar; it is possible that these two species will soon be included in the genus Chardezia instead.
 Cryptodifflugia sakotschawi and C. kelensis were mentioned by Tarnogradsky in 1945 but their descriptions were never published.
 Cryptodifflugia turfacea Zacharias, 1903 and C. vanhoornei Beyens et Chardez, 1987 are thought to be more probably a different genus because they're characterized by a retort-shaped shell.

References

Tubulinea
Amoebozoa genera